Guy de Pourtalès (4 August 1881 Berlin – 12 June 1941 Lausanne) was a Swiss author.

Early life and education 

He was the son of Herman Alexander de Pourtalès (1847–1904) and his first wife, Marguerite "Daisy" Marcet (1857–1888). Guy was born in Berlin, where his father at that time was an officer in the service of the Prussian king Wilhelm I. When he was six years old, the family returned to Switzerland, where they lived first at Malagny near Versoix in the Canton of Geneva and then, after his father's second marriage (with Hélène Barbey) in 1891, at Mies in the Canton de Vaud. Guy de Pourtalès went to schools in Geneva and in Vevey and then to the gymnasium in Neuchâtel. After his matura in 1899, he studied in Germany. In Karlsruhe, he began to study Chemistry, which he abandoned soon in favor of musical studies, which he continued from 1902 to 1905 at the University of Bonn. In 1905, he moved to Paris, where he studied literature at the Sorbonne.

Career as a writer 

Guy de Pourtalès published his first novel in Paris in 1910. One year later, he married Hélène Marcuard, with whom he had three children, and in 1912, his French nationality was restored upon his demand, since his family were Huguenots who had fled from France to Neuchâtel after the Edict of Fontainebleau revoking the Edict of Nantes. Just before World War I, his second novel appeared.

In 1914, he was drafted into service in the French army as a translator for the British troops in Flanders. At Ypres, he was gassed in 1915 and evacuated to Paris where he slowly recovered. He co-founded the Société littéraire de France, where he also published in 1917 his Deux contes de fées pour les grandes personnes ("Two fairy tales for grown-ups"). At the end of the war, he again served as a translator, this time for the American troops. After he was diagnosed with pulmonary tuberculosis in 1919, he rented the castle of Etoy in the Canton of Vaud in Switzerland in 1921 and henceforth would spend several months a year there. A large part of his literary work was written in Etoy.

From the 1920s on, Pourtalès published a series of romantic biographies of musicians and also wrote essays, critiques, and journalistic pieces for a variety of French magazines, amongst them the Nouvelle Revue Française. He also began to translate the works of Shakespeare in French, which raised the interest of Jacques Copeau. Pourtalès's translation of Measure for Measure was performed by the company of Georges Pitoëff in 1920 in Geneva and in Lausanne (with music by Arthur Honegger), and his translation of The Tempest was played by the company of Firmin Gémier in 1929 in Monte Carlo and at the Odéon theater in Paris.

In 1937, he published La Pêche miraculeuse, the novel for which he is best known today and which won him the Grand Prix du roman de l'Académie française.

Pourtalès's health had been slowly deteriorating, and when World War II broke out, he was severely ill and wouldn't leave Etoy anymore. His son Raymond (1914–1940), who served in the French army, fell in combat on 28 May 1940. The death of his only son and the surrender of France seem to have weakened Guy de Pourtalès, who died at Lausanne on 12 June 1941.

Works
La Cendre et la flamme, Félix Juven, 1910
Solitudes, Bernard Grasset, 1913
À mes amis Suisses, Crès, 1916
Deux contes de fées pour les grandes personnes, Paris, Société littéraire de France, 1917
"Odet de La Noue, soldat et poète huguenot de la fin du XVIe siècle", Bulletin de la Société d'histoire du protestantisme français, 1918–1919
Marins d'eau douce, Paris, Société littéraire de France, 1919
 La parabole des talents, 1923
 De Hamlet à Swann, essais de critique. Gallimard, 1924
 La vie de Franz Liszt, Gallimard, 1925
 Chopin ou le poète, Gallimard, 1926
 Montclar, Gallimard, 1926
 Louis II de Bavière ou Hamlet Roi, Gallimard, 1928
 Trilogie Shakespearienne, traduction de Hamlet, Mesure pour Mesure et la Tempête, Gallimard, 1929
 Nietzsche en Italie, Bernard Grasset, 1929
 Florentines, Gallimard, 1930
 Nous, a qui rien n'appartient, voyage au pays Kmer, Flammarion, 1931
 Wagner histoire d'un artiste, Gallimard, 1932
 La Pêche miraculeuse, Gallimard, 1937 - Grand Prix du roman de l'Académie française
 Berlioz et l'Europe romantique, Gallimard, 1939
 Les Contes du milieu du monde, Fribourg: Egloff, 1940
 Saints de pierre, Fribourg: Egloff, 1941 (posthumous)
 Chaque Mouche a son ombre, memoires, Gallimard, 1980
 Journal, diary, Gallimard, 1991

Prizes
Grand Prix du roman de l'Académie française 1937 for La Pêche miraculeuse

References

Literature
Rougemont, Denis de: Guy de Pourtalès: Exposition du Centenaire, Genève: Château de Penthes, 1981
Fornerod, Françoise: Histoire d’un roman : "La pêche miraculeuse" de Guy de Pourtalès, Genève: Slatkine, 1985. .
Fornerod, Françoise: Guy de Pourtalès, pp. 473–490 in Francillon, R.: Histoire de la littérature en Suisse romande, Lausanne: Editions Payot, 1997. .

External links
 
Fondation Guy de Pourtalès
Bibliography
Family tree

Writers from Berlin
Swiss writers
1881 births
1941 deaths
Grand Prix du roman de l'Académie française winners
Recipients of the Croix de Guerre 1914–1918 (France)
Pourtalès family